The 1894 Wealdstone Urban District Council election took place in December 1894 to elect members of Wealdstone Urban District Council in London, England. The council had been created under the Local Government Act 1894, and the whole council was up for election. Of the 12 members elected, 9 had been endorsed by an organisation known as the Ratepayers’ Defence Association. Balk, who was elected, and Woodhead, who wasn't, received the endorsement of a public meeting of workmen.

Election result

References

1894
1894 English local elections